Zhangfang, may refer to:

 Zhangfang, Liuyang, a rural town in Liuyang, Hunan, China
 Zhangfang, Beijing, a suburban town in Fangshan District of Beijing, China